Malise IV of Strathearn (Gaelic: Maol Íosa; died c. 1329) was a Scottish nobleman, the seventh known ruler of 
Strathearn. He was an ardent supporter of King Robert the Bruce, in contrast to his father, Malise III, who sided with Edward I of England.

He is first recorded in January 1306, when he and his mother petitioned King Edward to release his father, who had been mistakenly imprisoned. In 1309 he is noted as having received gifts of money and wine from Edward; nevertheless, he joined King Robert's side, and fought with him at the siege of Perth Castle in 1312, while his father fought for the English defenders. On the fall of the castle, the elder Malise was captured by his son, who then took control of the earldom of Strathearn.

Little more is known of him, as his name does not often appear on record. He was one of the earls who signed the Declaration of Arbroath in 1320, and married at least twice. Though the identity of his first wife is not known, we know that by her he had a son and a daughter: Malise, who succeeded his father as eighth Earl, and Mary or Maria, who married John de Moray of Drumsargard. His second wife, whom he married around 1323, was Jean or Joanna, daughter of Sir John Menteith of Ruskie. They had no issue. After the Earl's death around 1329, the Dowager Countess would go on to marry three more times. Her third husband, Maurice Murray, was granted the earldom of Strathearn after it was lost by the eighth Earl.

Ancestry

Bibliography
The Scots Peerage, ed. James Balfour Paul, Vol VIII (Edinburgh: David Douglas, 1911), pp. 251–2
 Neville, Cynthia J., Native Lordship in Medieval Scotland: The Earldoms of Strathearn and Lennox, c. 1140-1365, (Portland & Dublin, 2005)

1329 deaths
People from Perth and Kinross
Year of birth unknown
Place of birth unknown
Date of death unknown
Place of death unknown
13th-century births
Signatories to the Declaration of Arbroath
14th-century Scottish earls
Scottish people of the Wars of Scottish Independence
Mormaers of Strathearn